Ecological damage may refer to:
 environmental degradation
 something adversely affecting ecological health
 something adversely affecting ecosystem health

Ecology